Kissed is a 1922 American silent comedy film directed by King Baggot and starring Marie Prevost, Lloyd Whitlock, and Lillian Langdon.

Plot
As described in a film magazine, irrepressible young woman Constance Keener (Prevost) has her own ideas about choosing a husband. At a masquerade ball she is kissed by a stranger and thinks she has found her ideal. However, she is unable to determine which of three men, dressed alike, delivered the kiss. She finally decides it was Dr. Moss (Whitlock) and agrees to elope with him. While leaving on a train she discovers, when he kisses her, that Dr. Moss is not the man from the ball. When the train is held up by a bandit and she is kissed by the "highwayman," she then finds her ideal, the young millionaire Merson Torrey (Glendon) who originally sought her hand.

Cast
 Marie Prevost as Constance Keener 
 Lloyd Whitlock as Dr. Sherman Moss 
 Lillian Langdon as Mrs. Keener 
 J. Frank Glendon as Merson Torrey 
 Arthur Hoyt as Horace Peabody 
 Percy Challenger as Editor Needham 
 Harold Miller as Bobb Rennesdale 
 Marie Crisp as Miss Smith 
 Harold Goodwin as Jim Kernochan

Preservation
A copy of Kissed is held by the Museum of Modern Art.

References

Bibliography
 Munden, Kenneth White. The American Film Institute Catalog of Motion Pictures Produced in the United States, Part 1. University of California Press, 1997.

External links

1922 films
1922 comedy films
1920s English-language films
American silent feature films
Silent American comedy films
Films directed by King Baggot
American black-and-white films
Universal Pictures films
1920s American films